Forest farming is the cultivation of high-value specialty crops under a forest canopy that is intentionally modified or maintained to provide shade levels and habitat that favor growth and enhance production levels. Forest farming encompasses a range of cultivated systems from introducing plants into the understory of a timber stand to modifying forest stands to enhance the marketability and sustainable production of existing plants.

Forest farming is a type of agroforestry practice characterized by the "four I's": intentional, integrated, intensive and interactive. Agroforestry is a land management system that combines trees with crops or livestock, or both, on the same piece of land. It focuses on increasing benefits to the landowner as well as maintaining forest integrity and environmental health.  The practice involves cultivating non-timber forest products or niche crops, some of which, such as ginseng or shiitake mushrooms, can have high market value. 

Non-timber forest products (NTFPs) are plants, parts of plants, fungi, and other biological materials harvested from within and on the edges of natural, manipulated, or disturbed forests. Examples of crops are ginseng, shiitake mushrooms, decorative ferns, and pine straw.  Products typically fit into the following categories: edible, medicinal and dietary supplements, floral or decorative, or specialty wood-based products.

History

Forest farming, though not always by that name, is practiced around the world. For centuries, humans have relied on fruits, nuts, seeds, parts of foliage and pods from trees and shrubs in the forests to feed themselves and their livestock. Over time, certain species have been selected for cultivation near homes or livestock to provide food or medicine. For example, in the southern United States, mulberry trees are used as a feedstock for pigs and often cultivated near pig quarters.

In 1929, J. Russell Smith, Emeritus Professor of Economic Geography at Columbia University, published "Tree Crops – A Permanent Agriculture" which stated that crop-yielding trees could provide useful substitutes for cereals in animal feeding programs, as well as conserve environmental health. Toyohiko Kagawa read and was heavily influenced by Smith’s publication and began experimental cultivation under trees in Japan during the 1930s. Through forest farming, or three-dimensional forestry, Kagawa addressed problems of soil erosion by persuading many of Japan's upland farmers to plant fodder trees to conserve soil, supply food and feed animals. He combined extensive plantings of walnut trees, harvested the nuts and fed them to the pigs, then sold the pigs as a source of income. When the walnut trees matured, they were sold for timber and more trees were planted so that there was a continuous cycle of economic cropping that provided both short-term and long-term income to the small landowner.  The success of these trials prompted similar research in other countries. World War II disrupted communication and slowed advances in forest farming.  In the mid-1950s research resumed in places such as southern Africa.  Kagawa was also an inspiration to Robert Hart pioneered forest gardening in temperate climates in the sixties in Shropshire, England.

In earlier years, livestock were often considered part of the forest farming system. Now they are typically excluded and agroforestry systems that integrate trees, forages and livestock are referred to as silvopastures.  Because forest farming combines ecological stability of natural forests and productive agriculture systems, it is considered to have great potential for regenerating soils, restoring ground water supplies, controlling floods and droughts and cultivating marginal lands.  In addition to these benefits for re-establishing productive forests on marginal lands, forest farming is way to add financial value while conserving land that is currently forested, as discussed in the methods section.

In more recent years, there has been growing interest in locally grown and organic foods throughout the United States. There has been an increase in farmer’s markets and community-supported agriculture small enterprises.  These have also become outlets for NTFPs.  In order to stay competitive, many farmers look to add unique crops to their product line.  With the quantity and quality of resources developing online that offer tutorials and educational information on how to create and maintain forest farms, forest gardens, how to cultivate specific crops such as shiitake mushrooms and how to successfully market these items, forest farming is expanding as a viable land management practice.  Good places to look for research-based resources are the USDA National Agroforestry Center’s publication section, the Center for Agroforestry at the University of Missouri, the Cornell Cooperative Extension, the Non-Timber Forest Products website by The Virginia Tech Department of Wood Science and Forest Products, the USDA Forest Service Southern Research Station and the Top of the Ozarks RC&D in Missouri and the collaborative Forest Farming community of practice on eXtension.org, the online presence of the Cooperative Extension System of the US Land Grant Universities.

Principles
Forest farming principles constitute an ecological approach to forest management.  Forest resources are judiciously used while biodiversity and wildlife habitat are conserved. Forest farms have the potential to restore ecological balance to fragmented second growth forests through intentional manipulation to create the desired forest ecosystem.

In some instances, the intentional introduction of species for botanicals, medicinals, food or decorative products is accomplished using existing forests. The tree cover, soil type, water supply, land form and other site characteristics determine what species will thrive. Developing an understanding of species/site relationships as well as understanding the site limitations is necessary to utilize these resources for production needs, while conserving adequate resources for the long-term health of the forest.

Apart from the environmental benefits, forest farming can increase the economic value of forest property and provide short- and long-term benefits to the landowner.  Forest farming provides economic return from intact forest ecosystems, but timber sales can remain part of the long-term management strategy.

Methods
Forest farming methods may include: Intensive, yet careful thinning of overstocked, suppressed tree stands; multiple integrated entries to accomplish thinning so that systemic shock is minimized; and interactive management to maintain a cross-section of healthy trees and shrubs of all ages and species. Physical disturbance to the surrounding area should be minimized. The following are forest farming techniques described in the Training Manual produced by the Center for Agroforestry at the University of Missouri.

Level of management that is required 
(from most intense to least intense)

1. Forest gardening is the most intensive of forest farming methods. In addition to thinning the overstory, this method involves clearing the understory of undesirable vegetation and other practices that are closely related to agronomy (tillage, fertilization, weeding, and control of disease and insects and wildlife management). Due to input levels, this method often produces lower valued products compared to other methods. Forest gardens take advantage of the vertical levels of light availability and space under the forest canopy so that more than one crop can be grown at once if desired.

2. Wild-simulated seeks to maintain a natural growing environment, yet enriches local NTFP populations to create an abundant renewable supply of the products. Minimal disturbance and natural growing conditions ensure products will be similar in appearance and quality of those harvested from the wild. Rather than till, practitioners often rake leaves to expose soil, sow seed directly onto the ground, and then cover with leaves again. Since this method produces NTFPs that closely resemble wild plants; they often command a higher price than NTFPs produced using the forest gardening method.

3. Forest tending involves adjusting tree crown density to manipulate light levels that favor natural reproduction of desirable NTFPs. This low intensity management approach does not involve supplemental planting to increase populations of desired NTFPs.

4. Wildcrafting is the harvesting of naturally growing NTFPs. It is not considered a forest farming practice since there is no human involvement in the plant’s establishment and maintenance. However, wildcrafters often take steps to protect NTFPs with future harvests in mind. It becomes agroforestry once forest thinnings, or other inputs, are applied to sustain or maintain plant populations that might otherwise succumb to successional changes in the forest. The most important difference between forest farming and wildcrafting is that forest farming intentionally produces NTFPS, whereas wildcrafting seeks and gathers from naturally growing NTFPs.

Production considerations 
Forest farming can be a small business opportunity for landowners and requires careful planning, including a business and marketing plan. Learning how to market the NTFPs on the Internet is an option, but may entail higher shipping costs. Landowners should consider all options for selling their products including, farmer’s markets or restaurants that focus on locally grown ingredients. The development phase should include a forest management plan that states the landowner’s objectives and a resource inventory. Start-up costs should be analyzed as specific equipment may be necessary to harvest or process the product, whereas other crops require minimal initial investment. Local incentives for sustainable forest management, as well as regulations and policies should be explored.  The Convention on International Trade in Endangered Species of Wild Fauna and Flora (CITES) regulates international trade of certain plant (American ginseng and goldenseal) and animal species. To be legally exported, regulated plants must be harvested and records kept according to CITES rules and restrictions. Many states also have harvesting regulations for certain native plants that are searchable online.  Another good source to start with on information is the  Medicinal Plants at Risk 2008 report, by the Center for Biological Diversity] in the U.S.

Examples of crops 
(from the National Agroforestry Center)

Medicinal herbs:
 Ginseng (Panax quinquefolius)
 Black Cohosh (Actaea racemosa)
 Goldenseal (Hydrastis canadensis)
 Bloodroot (Sanguinaria canadensis)
 Pacific yew (Taxus brevifolia)
 Mayapple (Podophyllum peltatum)
 Saw palmetto (Serenoa repens)
 American Pokeweed  (Phytolacca americana)

Nuts:
 Black walnut (Juglans nigra)
 Hazelnut (Corylus avellana)
 Shagbark hickory (Carya ovata)
 Beechnut (Fagus sylvatica)

Fruit:
 Pawpaw (Asimina triloba)
 Currants (Ribes spp)
 Elderberry (Sambucus spp)
 Serviceberry (Amelanchier spp)
 Blackberry (Rubus spp)
 Huckleberry (Gaylussacia brachycera)

Other food crops:
 Ramps (wild leeks) (Allium tricoccum)
 Syrups (maple)
 Honey
 Mushrooms 
 Other edible roots

Other products: (mulch, decoratives, crafts, dyes)
 Pine straw
 Willow twigs
 Vines
 Beargrass (Xerophyllum tenax)
 Ferns
 Pine cones
 Moss

Native ornamentals:
 Rhododendron (Rhododendron catawbiense)
 Highbush cranberry (Viburnum trilobum)
 Flowering dogwood (Cornus florida)

See also 
 Christmas tree cultivation
 Farm Forestry Toolbox
 Plantation forestry
 Silvopasture

References

External links
 National Agroforestry Center (USDA)
 Agroforestry Practices by The Center for Agroforestry, University of Missouri.
 Hwwff.cce.cornell.edu
 Ces.ncsu.edu
 Trees with Edible Leaves The Perennial Agriculture Institute.
 Ntfpinfo.us
 Dcnr.state.pa.us

Forest management
Agroforestry
Sustainable agriculture
Non-timber forest products